Bolton is an unincorporated community in eastern Harrison County, in the U.S. state of Missouri.

The community is on a ridge between Cat Creek to the east and Fox Creek to the west approximately ten miles east-southeast of Bethany. The Wayne Helton Memorial State Wildlife Area is adjacent to the northeast.

History
A post office called Bolton was established in 1858, and remained in operation until 1903. An early variant name was "Browns", after the local Brown family.

References

Unincorporated communities in Harrison County, Missouri
Unincorporated communities in Missouri